The 1937 Victorian state election was held in the Australian state of Victoria on Saturday 2 October 1937 to elect 45 of the 65 members of the state's Legislative Assembly.

Background
On 21 March 1936, Patrick Denigan of the Labor Party won the seat of Allandale in a by-election following the death of UAP member Thomas Parkin. This changed the number of seats in the assembly to UAP 24, Labor 18.

Results

Legislative Assembly

|}

See also
Candidates of the 1937 Victorian state election
1937 Victorian Legislative Council election

References

1937 elections in Australia
Elections in Victoria (Australia)
1930s in Victoria (Australia)
October 1937 events